The 2009 TCU Horned Frogs football team represented Texas Christian University in the 2009 NCAA Division I FBS football season. The team was coached by Gary Patterson. The Frogs played their home games at Amon G. Carter Stadium, which is located on campus in Fort Worth. The Horned Frogs finished the season 12–1 (8–0 MWC) and won the Mountain West Conference title. On December 6, they were invited to their first Bowl Championship Series game and their first major bowl since the 1959 Cotton Bowl Classic, against #6 Boise State in the Tostitos Fiesta Bowl on January 4, 2010.  In the Fiesta Bowl, TCU was upset by underdog Boise State, 17–10.

Schedule

Roster

Rankings

References

TCU
TCU Horned Frogs football seasons
Mountain West Conference football champion seasons
TCU Horned Frogs football